Stade Roumdé Adjia is a multi-purpose stadium in Garoua, Cameroon.  It is currently used mostly for football matches. It serves as a home ground of Cotonsport Garoua. The stadium holds 30,000 people and was built in 1978. This stadium is set to be one of the stadiums used in the African Cup of Nations in 2021. It was renovated by Portuguese group Mota-Engil.

References

External links

 Garoua Presentation

Sports venues completed in 1978
Football venues in Cameroon
Multi-purpose stadiums in Cameroon
Garoua
Coton Sport FC de Garoua
1978 establishments in Cameroon